The Round O Jetty is located in Brooke Park in Enniskillen and on the River Erne which is part of the Lough Erne waterway system.  Boats can moor alongside the jetty and a boat for tourists runs to Devenish Island in the summer months. Normally the MV Kestrel runs to Devenish Island.

Facilities in Brooke Park include a cafe and toilets.

Location

The Round O is in Enniskillen within walking distance of the town centre, including the Ulsterbus station.  Enniskillen is located in County Fermanagh, in the west of Northern Ireland.

See also
Waterways Ireland

References 

 Fermanagh Lakeland Tourism

County Fermanagh
 
Enniskillen